The  is a concrete arch-gravity dam on the Tadami River,  southwest of Tadami in Fukushima Prefecture, Japan. The primary purpose of the dam is hydroelectric power generation and it supports a 182 MW power station. The power station contains two Kaplan turbine-generators. Unit 1 (95 MW) was commissioned on 20 November 1963 while Unit 2 (87 MW) was commissioned on 7 June 2003 as part of a power plant expansion project that included an additional 200 MW generator at Okutadami Dam upstream.

See also

List of power stations in Japan
Tagokura Dam – located downstream

References

Dams in Fukushima Prefecture
Hydroelectric power stations in Japan
Arch-gravity dams
Dams completed in 1963
Dams on the Tadami River
Energy infrastructure completed in 1963
1963 establishments in Japan